The Amgen Helix Pedestrian Bridge is a pedestrian bridge in Seattle, in the U.S. state of Washington. The bridge was designed by Johnson Architecture and KPFF Engineers.

References

External links
 

Bridges in Seattle
Pedestrian bridges in Washington (state)